Kai Feng may refer to:

Kai Feng (politician) (1906–1955), Chinese politician
Kai Z. Feng (born 1982), Chinese photographer